Bautzen II was a 20th-century political prison in the town of Bautzen in Saxony operational during the communist regime in East Germany. It was the only East German prison directly under the control of the Stasi.

It now stands as an open-air museum and memorial to its harsh history, entered at no charge.

History

The history of the prison may be divided into four broad phases: court prison, prison under Nazi regime, prison during communist period, and present day museum.

Court Prison
The building was built in 1906. It was relatively advanced for the time having electric lighting throughout and steam air heating.

From 1906 to 1933 the building served as a relatively commonplace prison linked to the encircling police headquarters and courtrooms to the south on Lessingstrasse. The building had 157 cells holding up to 203 prisoners (most cells being single occupancy). Occupancy was general short pre-trial periods and shorter sentences for lesser crimes at post-trial.

Due to a general under-occupancy, the prison was shared with captured prisoners-of-war from 1916 to 1918.

From 1923 to 1933, due to reforms in the Weimar Republic the prison went through its most lenient period.

Nazi Regime

When the Nazis came to power in 1933 Bautzen changed in atmosphere and quickly became a place where political prisoners, especially those with communist views, were imprisoned. From 1939 resistance fighters captured in other countries were placed in Bautzen II.

Communist Regime

Unfortunately the fall of the Nazis in 1945 did not bring any improvement to Bautzen. Although all the former communist sympathisers were released, the overall role as a political prison continued.

From 1945 to 1949 it was run by the Soviet Secret Police. This period was the prison's most crowded, with up to 400 prisoners in the space designed for 200.

From 1949 the prison was run by the Saxony Judiciary. After a period of reorganisation, it was used as a detention centre from 1951 to 1956. However, in 1956 it passed to the newly created Ministry of State Security (generally known as the Stasi). The nature of imprisonment changed radically and punishments became unusually harsh. People aiding escape to the west were regularly sentenced to 15 years, an extremely harsh punishment designed as a strong deterrent. Overall numbers grew further, peaking at 260 in 1962. During this period Amnesty International became involved both in prison conditions and the nature of those imprisoned.

From 1963 one wing on the first floor housed female political prisoners (up to 19).

Only one known escape was realised: Dieter Hötger in 1967. He was recaptured nine days later.

Museum

Political prisoners were released in 1989 very soon after the reunification of Germany. From 1989 a small number of petty criminals (a maximum of 23) were still held in the prison, but in January 1992 it finally closed completely.

After some discussion it was decided to retain the prison in its entirety as a memorial and free museum. It is accessed from the north-east, as the police headquarters and law courts remain operational to south, east and west. It opened as a museum in 1993. Most of the building is preserved untouched. Some of the larger rooms contain exhibits explaining the history of the building, some of the prisoners, and some of the guards. The exercise yards are only accessible by special request.

There is no fee to visit. Volunteers offer some information. The outer buildings contain a self-service cafe and a display of East German prison transport.

The prison is accessed from the north off Weigangstrasse.

Karnickelberg Graveyard

A graveyard for prisoners who died of illness or from beatings lies on Talstrasse in northern Bautzen, close to Bautzen I (the Yellow Misery). This mainly represents death in the Soviet period 1945 to 1949.

The area was formalised in 1990 into an area capable of public visitation, and information boards were added. A memorial chapel was erected in 2000 providing shelter and more information on the victims.

Notable Prisoners
see
Julius Fučík (journalist)
Helmut Brandt
Georg Dertinger
Karl Wilhelm Fricke
Otto Maercker
Herbert Crüger
Walter Janka
Gustav Just
Heinz Zöger
Wolfgang Harich
Erich Loest
Kurt Vieweg
Heinz Brandt
Rudolf Bahro
Armin Raufeisen
Hannes Sieberer

References

Prisons in Germany
Stasi